Manuel Porzner (born 25 February 1996) is a German racing cyclist, who currently rides for German amateur team RSG Ansbach.

Major results
2013
 6th Overall Internationale Niedersachsen-Rundfahrt
1st Stage 4
2014
 3rd Overall Sint-Martinusprijs Kontich
1st  Points classification
 8th Trofeo comune di Vertova
2015
 Tour de Hongrie
1st Prologue & Stage 3
2017
 3rd Time trial, National Under-23 Road Championships
2018
 5th GP Kranj
 7th Croatia–Slovenia

References

External links
 

1996 births
Living people
German male cyclists
People from Ansbach
Sportspeople from Middle Franconia
Cyclists from Bavaria